Calliotropis hysterea is a species of sea snail, a marine gastropod mollusk in the family Eucyclidae.

Description
The length of the shell reaches up to 6mm, covered by iridescent nacre spines along the outside, much like other species in the genus Calliotropis.

Distribution
This marine species occurs off New Caledonia

References

 Vilvens C. (2007) New records and new species of Calliotropis from Indo-Pacific. Novapex 8 (Hors Série 5): 1–72.

External links
 

hysterea
Gastropods described in 2007